Ortonville Township is a township in Big Stone County, Minnesota, United States. The population was 2,011 as of the 2010 census.

History
The first white settlement at Ortonville Township was made in the early 1870s. It was named for Cornelius Knute Orton, an early settler.

Geography

Cities, towns, villages
 Ortonville (vast majority)

Unincorporated towns
Cashtown at 
(This list is based on USGS data and may include former settlements.)

Major highways
  U.S. Route 12
  U.S. Route 75
  Minnesota State Highway 7

Lakes
 Big Stone Lake (east edge)
 Lindgren Lake
 Munnwyler Lake
 Walter Lake

Adjacent townships
 Big Stone Township (north)
 Otrey Township (northeast)
 Odessa Township (east)
 Yellow Bank Township, Lac qui Parle County (south)

Cemeteries
The township contains Mound Cemetery.

Demographics
As of the census of 2000, there were 2,287 people, 977 households, and 635 families residing in the township. The racial makeup of the township was 97.77% White, 0.39% African American, 0.83% Native American, 0.09% Asian,  0.31% from other races, and 0.61% from two or more races. Hispanic or Latino of any race were 0.57% of the population.

There were 977 households, out of which 28.0% had children under the age of 18 living with them, 54.7% were married couples living together, 7.7% had a female householder with no husband present, and 35.0% were non-families. 33.1% of all households were made up of individuals, and 20.0% had someone living alone who was 65 years of age or older.  The average household size was 2.26 and the average family size was 2.87.

In the township the population was spread out, with 23.8% under the age of 18, 5.1% from 18 to 24, 20.1% from 25 to 44, 24.8% from 45 to 64, and 26.2% who were 65 years of age or older.  The median age was 46 years. For every 100 females, there were 85.9 males.  For every 100 females age 18 and over, there were 81.6 males.

The median income for a household in the township was $30,000, and the median income for a family was $38,486. Males had a median income of $30,250 versus $20,101 for females. The per capita income for the township was $16,873.  About 6.8% of families and 9.3% of the population were below the poverty line, including 9.2% of those under age 18 and 9.1% of those age 65 or over.

References
 United States National Atlas
 United States Census Bureau 2007 TIGER/Line Shapefiles
 United States Board on Geographic Names (GNIS)

Townships in Big Stone County, Minnesota
Townships in Minnesota